Friday or Another Day (French: Vendredi ou un autre jour) is a French language film, directed by Yvan Le Moine, which was released in 2005.

Inspired by the novel Friday, or, The Other Island, written by Michel Tournier, it was shot in La Réunion with the main actors Philippe Nahon and Alain Moraïda.
It was awarded the Swiss Critics Boccalino Award at the Locarno International Film Festival in 2005 .

Cast
 Philippe Nahon : Philippe de Nohan
 Alain Moraïda : Vendredi
 Ornella Muti : Madame de Nohan
 Hanna Schygulla : The patroness
 Philippe Grand'Henry : Joseph
 Jean Hermann : The priest
 Jean-Paul Ganty : Tristan
 Valérie D'Hondt : The maid
 Frédéric Guillaume : The baker

References

External links
 Friday or Another Day at the Internet Movie Database
 Friday or Another Day at Cineuropa

2005 films
2005 in France
Belgian adventure films
French adventure films
2000s French films